In 1909, after E. H. Close left the George E. Pomeroy Company, he established the E. H. Close Company. Close had played a significant part in what was then suburban development in and around Toledo, Ohio; these developments included most notably Harvard Terrace and Ottawa Hills, but also the lesser known developments of Halsted Heights, Hillcrest Gardens, Homewood Park, Home Acres, and others.

"The day of cramped, crowded city lots is passing and the movement toward the suburbs is more pronounced now."
- E. H. Close, 1910

References 

Companies based in Toledo, Ohio